James Keogh may refer to:

 James Keogh (Australian politician), member of the Queensland Legislative Assembly
 James Keogh (speechwriter), executive editor of Time magazine and White House speechwriter under Richard M. Nixon
 James Keogh (Wisconsin politician), member of the Wisconsin general assembly
 Vance Joy (James Gabriel Keogh), Australian singer and songwriter
 Jim Keogh (banker), British banker
 Jim Keogh (footballer), Australian rules footballer
 Jim Keogh (technology writer), American technology writer